Rivers of London may refer to

 Blue Ribbon Network, a policy element of the London Plan relating to the navigable waterways of London
 Rivers of London (novel), a 2011 urban fantasy novel by Ben Aaronovitch
 Peter Grant (book series) - the series of books entitled Rivers of London
 Subterranean rivers of London

See also
 :Category:Rivers of London